People's Movement for the State (NPZD) is an announced political movement in Serbia. It was initiated by Aleksandar Vučić, the president of Serbia and the president of the Serbian Progressive Party, in March 2023.

History 

The Serbian Progressive Party (SNS) was founded in 2008 as a split from the Serbian Radical Party, a far-right political party. It was led by Tomislav Nikolić until the 2012 elections, when he resigned as the president of SNS after being elected president of Serbia. He was succeeded by Aleksandar Vučić. Vučić succeeded Nikolić as president of Serbia after the 2017 presidential election. In the 2022 general elections, SNS received less votes than in the 2020 parliamentary election. Vučić then hinted the potential creation of a political bloc or a movement that would act as the "rebranded" SNS in September 2022. Nova and Vreme compared the announced movement to the All-Russia People's Front, stating that "the only common goal of the blocs is to strengthen [Vučić's and Vladimir Putin's] personal ratings". The movement was initially referred to as the Movement for Serbia, Serb Bloc, and My Serbia in the media.

On 8 March 2023, Vučić announced the formation of the People's Movement for the State (NPZD). Political scientist Boban Stojanović described the formation of NPZD as "the preparation for the next snap parliamentary elections". Vučić affirmed that SNS would not be dissolved and that NPZD would act as a "supra-party movement". Miloš Vučević, the minister of defence, said that whether NPZD will take part in the next elections or only act as an advisory body for SNS will be announced at the next SNS assembly. He also noted that until the party assembly there would not be any formal activities regarding the formation, nor regarding the official name of the bloc. Vučić announced that he would call the assembly to be held on 27 May 2023 and that NPZD will be formalised in late May 2023 or early June 2023. Its first campaign rally was held in Vranje on 11 March 2023.

Ideology and platform 
According to newspaper Danas, the bloc would promote "responsible national and civic positions" and economically liberal policies. Bojan Klačar, the executive director of CeSID, stated for Blic that the movement would most likely be ideologically oriented towards the centre-right but that it would lean closer to the centre. Nova reported that the movement would be positioned in the centre, that it would support the accession of Serbia to the European Union, and oppose sanctions on Russia due to the Russian invasion of Ukraine. Deutsche Welle also reported that NPZD would represent the "third way" in Serbian politics, while Nataša Anđelković, a BBC News journalist, concluded that its orientation is not strictly defined. Political scientist Věra Stojarová noted that NPZD could adopt populist elements. Euronews said that the with the creation of the movement, politically extremist and pro-Russian individuals could be excluded from taking part in the movement. Vučić and Vučević described NPZD as a "state-building movement".

Organisation

Leadership 
Nova reported that the movement would not officially have a president but that Vučić would instead act as its representative while Danas reported that Vučić would preside over the body that would include leaders of other political parties. Political scientist Mladen Mrdalj said that "Vučić will try to change the leadership machinery of SNS with the formation of the bloc".

Members 
Political commentator Predrag Rajić said that "the most logical thing for the movement would be to include ruling parties"; he named the Social Democratic Party of Serbia, Movement of Socialists, Socialist Party of Serbia, and United Serbia as potential members. Political scientist Zoran Stojiljković said that it could also include minor parties like the Serbian Renewal Movement and individuals that are supportive of Vučić but were not directly active in politics. Danas reported that PUPS – Solidarity and Justice and Strength of Serbia Movement are also potential members to join NPZD. Klačar said the bloc could be "widely spaced" and that it could exclude far-right parties, while Predrag Lacmanović of Faktor Plus said that opposition parties also might get invited to join the bloc. Vučić stated that the bloc "also needs Bosniaks, Hungarians, Roma, Slovaks, and Romanians in it" and that independent individuals would be apart of the bloc. At the party conference on 10 March 2023, SNS stated its support for the formation of NPZD.

References

External links 

2023 establishments in Serbia
Serbian Progressive Party
Political movements in Serbia